Arianites may refer to:

 David Arianites, strategos autokrator of Bulgaria (fl. 1016–1027)
 Constantine Arianites, magistros and doux of Adrianople
 Constantine Arianiti or Constantine Komnenos Arianites
 George Aryaniti or George Arianites, Lord of Albania (fl. 1434–1461)
 Arianiti family
 Arianites (ammonite), an extinct genus